Uzla is a village in Pınarbaşı District of Kastamonu Province, Turkey. Its population is 117 (2022).

Population

References

Villages in Pınarbaşı District, Kastamonu